Luke & Co was a boatbuilding firm, established in 1829 in Limehouse near London. They moved to Oakbank at Itchen Ferry in 1868, and in 1895, settled at Hamble. At Hamble, they designed and built yachts of all sizes, as well as providing all kinds of services to the yachts visiting or having a berth at the river. The river Hamble was a popular place to "lay up" yachts for the winter.

Early days 
There are at least three members of the Luke family known as boatbuilders: W. S. (Walter Smith) Luke (1844–1904), and his sons Walter G. Luke (born 1868) and Albert R. Luke (born 1875). The name of the yard changed over the years from W. S. Luke to W. G. Luke & Co (1895), to Hamble River Luke & Co. Ltd., and finally Luke Bros.

When W. S. Luke died in March 1904, his sons took over the yard: Albert ("Bert") as designer, and Walter managing the boatyard.

In their early days they built Itchen Ferrys, Fishing Smacks, Pilot boats and other sorts of working boats, like a 75-foot Lifeship to a design by Capt. Hans Busk in 1873. But there were also yachts built as early as the 1870s. In 1895, the yard moved from the river Itchen to the village of Hamble at the river of the same name, near Southampton. The former Itchen Yard then became known as Fields Yard. According to an advertisement in an 1891 edition of The Yachtsman, they had "Yachts for sale or hire, Spars, blocks, Anchors, and Galvanised Ironwork either kept in stock or made on the premises, all sorts of chandlery, mudberths". Soon after, they were based at Back Street (now Rope Walk) with building sheds, slipways and yacht stores. Hamble Point became their winter slips.

Luke mainly built boats to their own design, but they also built boats to the designs of Arthur Payne, F. R. S. Bircham, L. G. Moore, Frederick Shepherd, Albert Strange, St. C. Byrne, John I. Thornycroft & Company, H. Emmons, H. W. Ridsdale and John G. Alden. They also designed ships that were built by others such as William Fife, A. Westmacott, Camper & Nicholson, A. Apps, Randal Vogan, Everett and Lt.Col. G. P. Stewart.

French impressionist painter and amateur yacht designer Gustave Caillebotte writes in November 1882 and May 1883 in the French magazine Le Yacht about his disappointment in the yacht Diver, which he imported from England. She was a Luke-built yacht of extreme "plank on edge" design. Plank on edge designs were fashionable at that time in England under the then-current Rating Rules but were generally considered "crank" soon after.

Quaker Girl, an early International Rule 7 meter yacht from 1911, became a successful racing yacht and won A. R. Luke a design award.

In 1913, they built the "Hamble One Design" to their own design for local racing.

Aviation 

Hamble became an aviation centre at around 1910, and Luke built a prototype Seaplane to the design of F. Murphy, the HL1, as "Hamble River, Luke & Co." It was exhibited at Olympia’s in March 1914 but was not a success. At the start of World War I, they started building aircraft components.

They built at least one machine for Sopwith in 1913. It was the Sopwith Bat Boat (Type 1) No.BB2. This machine was assembled at the Salterns Yard of Hamble River, Luke & Co. and was delivered to the Navy at Calshot on 8 June 1913, to meet Contract CP32098/13, placed as a consequence of the 1913 Olympia Show. The aircraft was given Serial No.38 and served until September 1914.

The hydrobiplane (HL1) is described by several authors:

 HAMBLE hydrobiplane HL.l (Hamble River, Luke & Co., Hamble, Hampshire)
Constructed by an established boat building company, to the design of Frank Murphy, late of Bristol, the machine was shown incomplete at Olympia in March 1914. Changes were made later and the machine was tested by Gordon England, but costs were excessive, and the machine and the premises were put up for sale by July 1914.
The aircraft was a large two-seater pusher seaplane with twin wooden main floats and twin metal tail floats, moving with the rudders. There were four pairs of interplane struts each side, with radiators mounted on the innermost pairs. Ailerons were fitted to both top and bottom wings, the latter having pronounced dihedral.
The spruce tail booms, to be replaced by steel tubes later, extended aft from the second interplane struts. The tailplane and elevator were carried on the top booms, the pair of rudders pivoting on posts below. The pointed nose nacelle, was covered with two layers of cedar, laid up diagonally over the structure, and was mounted on short struts between the wings. The main floats were of similar construction, but rendered watertight, and were mounted on a steel tube chassis, intended to be sprung later.

Power: 150hp NAG (British-made) six-cylinder inline, water-cooled driving a Normale pusher propeller direct.
Data:
Span top 60ft
Span bottom 53ft
Chord 6ft
Gap 6ft
Length 30ft
Area 678 sq ft
Area tailplane 39 sq ft
Area elevator 33 sq ft
Area rudders 32 sq ft
Weight 1,3001b
Weight allup 2,550 lb
Speed range 32-65mph

Endurance 5hr

Hamble River, Luke H.L.1 The H.L.1 was built by Hamble River, Luke and Co., of Hamble, Hants., and was shown in an unfinished state at the 1914 Olympia Aero Show. It was a two-seat pusher seaplane designed by F. Murphy, who had worked previously as a designer with the British and Colonial Aeroplane Co., at Bristol. The machine featured a finely-finished cigar-shaped nacelle, at the rear of which was mounted a 150 h.p. N.A.G. six-cylinder German-designed and British-built engine, the radiators being fitted to the inter-plane struts on each side of the nacelle. The construction was of wood and fabric, and the wings were equipped with ailerons. The float structure was redesigned while the H.L.1 was being completed, and the machine was test-flown by E. C. Gordon England. Span. 60 ft. Wing area, 678 sq. ft. Weight empty, 1,600 lb. Weight loaded, 2.550 lb. Maximum speed. 65 m.p.h. Landing speed, 32 mph.

Flight, March 14, 1914.

WHAT THERE WILL BE TO SEE AT OLYMPIA.
THE EXHIBITS.

Hamble River (Hamble River, Luke and Co.). (68.)
On the stand of the Hamble River, Luke and Co. will be shown a seaplane which, whilst following standard lines as regards its general arrangement, is interesting from the point of view of construction. The nacelle, as will be seen from the accompanying sketch, is of cigar shape, and carries at its rear end a 150 h.p. N.A.G. engine. The main floats, of which there are two, are of rather novel design, and incorporate in their construction several new and interesting features. For the design of this machine, we understand Mr. F. Murphy, formerly connected with the British and Colonial Aeroplane Co., is responsible, and, although this machine has not as yet been tried, there is little doubt but that it will give a good account of itself in the future, and thus become a valuable addition to the list of British seaplanes.

Flight, March 28, 1914.

THE OLYMPIA EXHIBITION.
THE EXHIBITS.

HAMBLE RIVER (HAMBLE RIVER, LUKE AND CO.).

UNFORTUNATELY the seaplane exhibited on this stand was not completely finished at the opening of the Show, and the temporary wiring up of the machine was hurriedly done, so that it is to be feared that a great number of the visitors received an unfavourable impression of the quality of workmanship in it. This is much to be regretted since it is the first time the machine has been shown in public and the workmanship is really very good. When one or two minor alterations have been effected and the machine has been properly tuned up, there is little doubt but that it will give a good account of itself.

In its general arrangement, the seaplane follows standard practice, being a biplane of the "pusher" type and having two main floats and two tail floats. The upper main plane is straight whilst the lower plane is set at a very pronounced dihedral angle in order to provide ample clearance when the machine is rolling.
The two main floats are built up of two skins of cedar, the inner one of which is laid on diagonally over a framework of spruce and rock elm. The floats are divided into watertight compartments by double bulkheads, and a layer of canvas, soaked in varnish, is placed between the two skins. All the chassis struts carrying the floats are steel tubes, and it is intended, we understand, to provide springing of the floats by means of telescopic tubes and coil springs.

The cigar-shaped nacelle is of similar construction to that of the floats, and provides accommodation for the pilot and passengers. The seats are arranged tandem fashion, and the pilot controls the machine by means of a single vertical lever and a pivoted foot-bar. In the rear of the nacelle is mounted the engine, a 150 h.p. British N.A.G., which drives directly a Normale propeller.

The tail unit is carried on an outrigger consisting of four tail booms of spruce connected by struts of the same

material. These booms, one gathers, will later be replaced by steel tubes in order to provide a more rigid structure. The undivided elevator is hinged to the trailing edge of a fixed, non-lifting, stabilising plane, under the ends of which are mounted the twin rudders. Two small metal floats support the tail planes when the machine is at rest.

Aircraft 
 Hamble River H.L.1 Seaplane

After WWI 
After the war, Luke concentrated on yacht building again. They had moved a bit up-river, just north of where the present Royal Southern Yacht Club opened their premises in 1937. It expanded to Satchell Lane and was known as "Top Yard" or "North Yard", which is now Hamble Yacht Services.

In 1925, Luke & Co. designed and built the "Hamble Star one design" sailing dinghy which became a popular racing dinghy with the local Hamble River Sailing Club. Albert Luke became the first Honorary Secretary of this club, established right after the war. Walter later became the Honorary Treasurer and Flag Officer.

In 1923, French war hero and Tennis Champion Alain Gerbault wanted to buy the Luke-built Lady Maud (1907) from her then owner Captain Dixon, but the owner would not sell. Gerbault thereupon arranged to buy the Dixon Kemp-designed Firecrest (1892) and started his famous voyage, sailing solo around the globe.

In 1935, Luke designed and built the five tonner Teal One Design; several other boats of this design were built by other yards. Teal won the Round the Isle (Cowes) race in 1935 and 1936, and was featured in Uffa Fox's book Racing, Cruising and Design (another Teal-class yacht, Content, would also win the first post war Round the Isle Race in 1945). Uffa said of the Teal design: "Teal was a delight to the eye, as one would expect, for she was designed by Luke, of Hamble. She proved herself to be such an able boat, both as a racer and as a day cruiser that more were built the following year."

WWII 
During World War II, Luke & Co., then already known as Luke Bros., built L.C.A.s (Landing Craft Assault) and the smaller L.C.P.s (Landing Craft Personnel) to the design of John Thornycroft & Co. Ltd. They were designed to carry troops only and were used at D-Day.

Luke was taken over by Port Hamble Ltd. at the end of World War II. Bill Hobbs, who came to the yard as an apprentice in 1923 and who had been working there as draftsman and designer since the late twenties, then designed the "Luke 5 tonners" for Port Hamble Ltd.

Literature 
Luke's yard occasionally played a role in the novels of author Nevil Shute including prominent mentions in the novella "The Seafarers" published in 2002.

Henry Fienness Speed mentions his visit to the yard of "W. S. Luke" when still at Itchen Ferry in his book Cruises in Small Yachts and Big Canoes of 1883, recalling the rebuilding by Luke of the Kate (of E. Middleton fame), which the writer called exceptionally stiff because of the very tall mast she was rigged with, and partly describing the then-famous Itchen Lass of 1879 (see boat list), a racer with an apparently very thin keel.
Francis B. Cooke shows, among others, some design studies of A. R. Luke in the third edition of his book Cruising Hints.
The Yachtsman's Annual and Who's Who 1938–9 contains line drawings, including a description of A. R. Luke's design Allure. She was the last one built of three sister ships. The others were Themis, a yawl built in 1930 and Shiris, a yawl built in 1937 with shallower draft to navigate the French canals.
In A Manual of Yacht and Boat Sailing, regarding the latest Itchen-type boats, Dixon Kemp refers to the greater draught and the addition of a Yacht Counter: "Still, as they have grown out of the "Ithchen Boat," and still sail by a simple length measurement, it can be assumed that the 1882 craft is still to identified with Itchen Ferry, especially as the Itchen Ferry builders Payne and Luke have assisted in introducing these new-fashioned craft". The example, by a line drawing, is given of a boat of 30 ft waterline length.

Selection of boats 
Boats designed and/or built before 1940, showing tonnage (Thames measurement), year built, and designer (when known). Boats known to still exist as of 2011 are marked with a '*'.

References

External links 
 Alain Gerbault
 Flight magazine archives
 Nevil Shute
 Hamble local history
 Hamble-le-Rice

British yacht designers
British naval architects
Yacht building companies
Companies based in Hampshire